The Falling Creek Methodist Church and Cemetery (also known as the Falling Creek United Methodist Church) is a historic church in Lake City, Florida. It is located six miles northwest of Lake City, on SR 161. On April 4, 1996, it was added to the U.S. National Register of Historic Places.

References

External links
 Columbia County listings at National Register of Historic Places

United Methodist churches in Florida
Churches in Columbia County, Florida
Churches on the National Register of Historic Places in Florida
Methodist cemeteries
Lake City, Florida
National Register of Historic Places in Columbia County, Florida